Richard "Rickard" Hellsen is a former international motor speedway rider

Career
Silver medalist in the individual championship youth Sweden ( Avesta 1973). Multiple finalist individual championship of Sweden (best result: Eskilstuna 1982 - fourth place). Three-time gold medalist in pairs Sweden (1979, 1981, 1982). Five-time gold medalist Sweden team championships (1974, 1978, 1979, 1981, 1982).

Finalist of the World Cup pairs ( Krško 1980 - fourth place). Multiple representative of Sweden in the qualifying rounds of the World Cup team and individual World Championships (best result: Fjelsted 1982 - VIII place in the final of the Scandinavian).

Leagues competed in the Swedish and British, on the other clubs in the colours of King's Lynn Stars (1973, 1976–1985), Oxford Rebels (1975), White City Rebels (1976), Swindon Robins (1986–1988), Long Eaton (1989, 1990, 1992–1995), Peterborough Panthers (1991), Hackney Hawks (1991) and Milton Keynes Knights (1992).
It was with Oxford Rebels that he was part of the Midland Cup winning team in 1975. The team transferred to White City under Danny Dunton and Robert Dugard in 1976 after fears that the stadium at Cowley was to be sold for development.

Retired (last professional race): 1996
Since retiring has been restoring Volkswagen Beetles, building hot rods and Volkrods.

Lives in Beccles, Suffolk, and has two grandsons: Jack aged 4 and Ezra who is just 1 year old.(2016)[Source:Interview with Karl Fiala of Speedway Friends]

World Final Appearances

World Pairs Championship
 1980 -  Krsko, Matija Gubec Stadium (with Jan Andersson) - 4th - 18pts (9)

References

External links
 http://wwosbackup.proboards.com/thread/1347/richard-hellsen

1951 births
Living people
Swedish speedway riders
King's Lynn Stars riders
Oxford Cheetahs riders
White City Rebels riders
Swindon Robins riders
Long Eaton Invaders riders
Peterborough Panthers riders
Hackney Hawks riders
Milton Keynes Knights riders
Sportspeople from Stockholm